John Matthew Shippen Jr. (December 2, 1879 – May 20, 1968) was an American golfer who competed in several of the early U.S. Opens. Born in Washington D.C., he was the son of a former slave and Presbyterian minister, John Shippen Sr. and Eliza Spotswood Shippen, and is believed to be the first American-born golf professional.

Shippen, was of African American and Native American descent. At the age of 16, Shippen earned an assistant professional post at Shinnecock Hills Golf Club where he began giving lessons to some of the club members and became an accomplished player in his own right. Shippen's best finishes came at the 1896 U.S. Open held at Shinnecock Hills Golf Club in Southampton, New York, and the 1902 U.S. Open held  at Garden City Golf Club in Garden City, New York, where he tied for fifth place at both.

Early life
When he was nine his father was sent to serve as minister on the Shinnecock Indian Reservation—close to Shinnecock Hills—one of America's earliest golf clubs. John Jr. worked as a caddie at the course and was taught to play by the club's Scottish professional, Willie Dunn Jr.

1896 U.S. Open
The Shinnecock Hills course was chosen to host the second U.S. Open in 1896. Shippen played superb golf, finishing in fifth place. Prior to the start of the tournament, some club members had been so impressed with Shippen's talent for the game that they decided to pay his entry fee for the tournament, along with that of his close friend, Oscar Bunn, a Shinnecock Indian.

When the professional entrants for the competition found out a racial controversy had begun, they threatened to boycott the event, but they backed down after USGA president Theodore Havemeyer stated that the tournament would proceed even if only Shippen and Dunn took part. Shippen was paired with Charles B. Macdonald, winner of the first U.S. Amateur in 1895. He was tied for second place after the first of the two rounds, and remained in contention until he drove his ball onto a sandy road at the 13th hole and scored an eleven. If he had made par on that hole, he would have made a playoff for the championship, but he still finished in a tie for fifth and won $10 as the fourth-placed non-amateur. Scottish-born James Foulis won the $150 first prize.

Golf career
Shippen played in five more U.S. Opens, and his best finish was a tie for fifth in 1902. He made his career in golf and served as professional at several clubs, the last of which was Shady Rest Golf and Country Club in New Jersey, where he worked from 1932 until the club was acceded to the township of Scotch Plains in 1964. As a professional, Shippen made and sold his own clubs which bore a stamp reading "J. M. Shippen".

No other African-American played in the Open until Ted Rhodes took part in 1948.

Posthumous PGA of America membership
In 2009, the PGA of America granted posthumous membership to Shippen, Rhodes, and Bill Spiller who were denied the opportunity to become PGA members during their professional careers. The PGA also granted posthumous honorary membership to boxer Joe Louis.

Legacy and death

He died on May 20, 1968 at a nursing home in Newark, New Jersey. He is buried at the Rosedale Cemetery in Linden, New Jersey.

When the U.S. Open was played at Shinnecock Hills in 1986, Shippen was remembered during the ABC television broadcast. For many members of the former Shady Rest club, it was the first time they had learned of his accomplishments. The John Shippen Museum is located in the clubhouse of the Shady Rest Golf and Country Club in Scotch Plains. The John Shippen National Invitational Golf Tournament for Black Golfers was established by Intersport in 2021.

Results in major championships

Note: Shippen played only in the U.S. Open Championship.

"T" indicates a tie for a place
? = Unknown
Yellow background for top-10

References

External links
 
 
 

American male golfers
African-American golfers
Golfers from Washington, D.C.
Golfers from New York (state)
Golfers from New Jersey
People from Scotch Plains, New Jersey
1879 births
1968 deaths
20th-century African-American sportspeople